The British Columbia order of precedence is a nominal and symbolic hierarchy of important positions within the province of British Columbia. It has no legal standing but is used to dictate ceremonial protocol at events of a provincial nature.

 The King of Canada (His Majesty King Charles III)
 The Lieutenant Governor of British Columbia (Her Honour The Honourable Janet Austin OBC)
 The Premier of British Columbia (Hon. David Eby KC MLA)
 The Chief Justice of British Columbia (Robert J. Bauman)
 Former Lieutenant Governors of British Columbia (by seniority of assuming office)
 Hon. Iona Campagnolo PC OC OBC
 Hon. Steven Point OBC
 Hon. Judith Guichon OBC
 Former Premiers of British Columbia (by seniority of assuming office)
 Bill Vander Zalm
 Rita Johnston
 Mike Harcourt OC
 Glen Clark
 Dan Miller
 Hon. Ujjal Dosanjh PC
 Gordon Campbell OC OBC
 Christy Clark
 John Horgan
 The Speaker of the Legislative Assembly of British Columbia (Hon. Raj Chouhan )
 The Members of the Executive Council of British Columbia by order of precedence
 The Leader of the Official Opposition of British Columbia (Kevin Falcon )
 Members of the King's Privy Council for Canada resident in British Columbia, with precedence given to members of the federal cabinet
 The Chief Justice of the Supreme Court of British Columbia (Christopher E. Hinkson)
 Church representatives of faith communities
 The Justices of the Court of Appeal of British Columbia with precedence to be governed by the date of appointment
 The Puisne Justices of the Supreme Court of British Columbia with precedence to be governed by the date of appointment
 The Judges of the Supreme Court of British Columbia with precedence to be governed by the date of appointment
 The Members of the Legislative Assembly of British Columbia with precedence to be governed by the date of their first election to the legislature
 The Chief Judge of the Provincial Court of British Columbia (Melissa Gillespie)
 The Commander Maritime Forces Pacific (Rear-Admiral Bob Auchterlonie )
 The Heads of Consular Posts with jurisdiction in British Columbia with precedence to be governed by Article 16 of the Vienna Convention on Consular Relations
 The Mayor of Victoria (Marianne Alto)
 The Mayor of Vancouver (Ken Sim)
 The Chancellors of the University of British Columbia, the University of Victoria and Simon Fraser University, respectively.
 Hon. Steven Point OBC (accorded higher ranking as a living former Lieutenant Governor of British Columbia)
 Marion Buller, CM
 Tamara Vrooman, OBC

References

External links
Table of Precedence for British Columbia Page archived on March 27, 2013 

British Columbia
Government of British Columbia